Peg Leg is an album by jazz bassist Ron Carter, originally released on LP in 1978 and released on CD in 1991 by Fantasy Studios.

It was recorded in November 1977 and prominently features Carter on piccolo bass. Often carrying the melody the instrument is a focus of 3 of the album's 6 tracks, while fellow bass player Buster Williams performs the conventional role of the instrument on those tracks. The rhythm section is completed by piano and percussion (on all but 1 track), and guitar on 4 tracks. The standard jazz-ensemble is further augmented, on all 6 tracks, by woodwinds (see below).

Carter uses a piccolo bass tuned a fourth higher than a normal double bass (low to high: A-D-G-C).

Track listing
All compositions by Ron Carter except where noted
 "Peg Leg" - 8:08
 "Sheila's Song (Hasta Luego, Mi Amiga)" - 6:14
 "Chapter XI" - 5:41
 "Epistrophy" (Thelonious Monk) - 7:33
 "My Ship" (Kurt Weill, Ira Gershwin) - 5:10
 "Patchouli" - 7:06

Personnel

Ron Carter - piccolo bass, bass, percussion
Kenny Barron - piano
Jay Berliner - guitar
Buster Williams - bass (tracks 1, 3 and 4)
Ben Riley - drums, percussion

Woodwinds arranged and conducted by Robert M Freedman:  
Jerry Dodgion - flute, piccolo flute, alto flute, clarinet
George Marge - flute, piccolo flute, oboe, clarinet
Walter Kane - flute, bassoon, clarinet
Charles Russo - clarinet, bass clarinet

References

1978 albums
Milestone Records albums
Ron Carter albums
Albums recorded at Van Gelder Studio